Benjamin Jefferson Davis Jr. (September 8, 1903 – August 22, 1964), was an African-American lawyer and communist who was elected in 1943 to the New York City Council, representing Harlem. He faced increasing opposition from outside Harlem after the end of World War II. In 1949 he was among a number of communist leaders prosecuted for violating the Smith Act. He was convicted and sentenced to five years in prison.

Early years

Benjamin J. Davis Jr. – known to his friends as "Ben" – was born September 8, 1903, in Dawson, Georgia to Benjamin Davis, Sr. and Jimmie W. Porter. The family moved to Atlanta in 1909, where Davis's father, "Big Ben" Davis, established a weekly black newspaper, the Atlanta Independent. It was successful enough to provide a comfortable middle-class upbringing for his family. The elder Benjamin Davis emerged as a prominent black political leader and served as a member of the Republican National Committee for the state of Georgia.

The younger Ben Davis Jr. attended the high school program of Morehouse College in Atlanta. He left the South to study at Amherst College, where he earned his B.A. in 1925. Davis continued his education at Harvard Law School, from which he graduated in 1929. Davis worked briefly as a journalist before starting a law practice in Atlanta in 1932.

Political career

  Davis became radicalized through his role as defense attorney in the 1933 trial of Angelo Herndon, a 19-year-old black Communist who had been charged with violating a Georgia law against "attempting to incite insurrection", because he tried to organize a farm workers' union. Davis asked the International Juridical Association to review his brief. During the trial, Davis faced angry, racist opposition from the judge and public. He was impressed with the rhetoric and bravery of Herndon and his colleagues. After giving concluding arguments, he joined the Communist Party himself.

Herndon was convicted and sentenced to 18–20 years in jail. He was freed after April 26, 1937 when, by a 5-to-4 margin, the United States Supreme Court ruled Georgia's Insurrection Law to be unconstitutional.

Davis moved to Harlem, New York in 1935, joining the Great Migration of blacks out of the South to northern cities. He worked as editor of the Communist Party's newspaper targeted to African-Americans, The Negro Liberator. He later became editor of the CPUSA's official English-language daily, The Daily Worker.

In 1943, Davis was elected under the then-used system of proportional representation to fill a city council seat being vacated by Adam Clayton Powell Jr. to run for Congress. Davis was reelected in 1945, this time to a four-year term.

Davis lost his 1949 bid for re-election due to a number of factors. First, two years earlier, New York had ceased to use proportional representation and Harlem was broken up into three districts, diluting the black vote. Second, Davis’s opponent in the new 21st district was journalist Earl Brown, a fusion candidate for the Democratic, Republican, and Liberal parties. Finally, in July 1948, Davis was charged with conspiring to overthrow the federal government under the Smith Acta World War II-era charge that rested on Davis's association with the Communist Party. He was tried along with eleven other defendants for their communist beliefs and party affiliation in the Smith Act trials. Paul Robeson, noted actor, singer, and civil rights activist publicly advocated for Davis and his fellow defendants. His conviction was announced on October 13, only a few weeks before the election.

With only a month remaining in his last term, Davis was expelled from the city council, a requirement under state law. His former colleagues even passed a resolution celebrating his ouster. He appealed his conviction for two years all the way to the Supreme Court of the United States, without success. On March 1, 1955, after serving three years and four months in the federal penitentiary in Terre Haute, Indiana, Davis was freed. However, he was immediately transferred to the Allegheny County Jail in Pittsburgh, Pennsylvania, to serve an additional 60-day term for contempt of court. He had appeared there in 1953 as a defense witness for another group of five Communists charged under the Smith Act, but was asked and refused to answer questions about unrelated individuals involved in the Communist Party’s National Commission of Negro Work. In 1957, the Supreme Court revisited the Smith Act and reversed itself in Yates v. United States, which held that the First Amendment protected radical and reactionary speech, unless it posed a "clear and present danger."

In subsequent years, Davis engaged in a speaking tour of college campuses and remained politically active, promoting an agenda of civil rights and economic populism. Davis' 1962 speaking circuit drew crowds at schools such as Harvard, Columbia, Amherst, Oberlin and the University of Minnesota. But the City College of New Yorkin the New York council district he represented in the 1940sbarred Davis from speaking on its campus in this period. After a student protest, Davis was allowed to speak outside, on the street. He was close to Communist Party chairman William Z. Foster. Davis continued to publicly defend the actions of the Soviet Union, including the Soviet invasion of Hungary in 1956.

In 1962 Davis was charged with violating the Internal Security Act. He died shortly before the case came to trial.

Death

Ben Davis died of lung cancer in New York City on August 22, 1964. He was less than one month shy of his 61st birthday at the time of his death, and was in the midst of a campaign for New York State Senate on the People's Party ticket.

Legacy

While in prison, Davis had written notes for a memoir. These were confiscated by prison authorities and not released until after his death. They were posthumously published under the title Communist Councilman From Harlem (1969), with a foreword by his Smith Act codefendant Henry Winston.

Works

 "Must Negro Americans Wait?"
 "The Negro People in the Struggle for Peace and Freedom."
 "Upsurge in the South."
 "The Path of Negro Liberation."
 "Why I Am A Communist."
 "Ben Davis on the McCarran Act."

See also

 Smith Act trials of Communist Party leaders
 CPUSA
 Henry Winston
 J. Raymond Jones
 David Paterson

References

Further reading

 Glenda Elizabeth Gilmore, Defying Dixie: The Radical Roots of Civil Rights, 1919-1950. New York: W.W. Norton, 2008.
 Gerald Horne, Black Liberation/Red Scare: Ben Davis and the Communist Party. Newark, NJ: University of Delaware Press, 1994.
 Gerry Horwitz, "Benjamin Davis Jr. and the American Communist Party: A Study in Race and Politics," UCLA Historical Journal, vol. 4 (1983), pp. 92–107.
 Walter T. Howard, We Shall Be Free!: Black Communist Protests in Seven Voices. Philadelphia, PA: Temple University Press, 2013.
 William L. Patterson, Ben Davis: Crusader for Negro Freedom and Socialism. New York: New Century Publications, 1967.
 John C. Walker,The Harlem Fox: J. Raymond Jones at Tammany 1920:1970, New York: State University New York Press, 1989.
 Paterson, David “Black, Blind, & In Charge: A Story of Visionary Leadership and Overcoming Adversity.” New York, New York, 2020

External links

 Jarvis Tyner,  "The Legacy of Benjamin J. Davis", People's Weekly World.
 Oakley C. Johnson, "Chronological Table of Major Writings of Benjamin J. Davis Jr." ChickenBones: A Journal for Literary & Artistic African-American Themes.

1903 births
1964 deaths
African-American lawyers
African-American people in New York (state) politics
Activists for African-American civil rights
African-American communists
People convicted under the Smith Act
Amherst College alumni
Morehouse College alumni
American anti-racism activists
Harvard Law School alumni
New York City Council members
People from Harlem
People from Dawson, Georgia
Georgia (U.S. state) lawyers
Deaths from lung cancer in New York (state)
20th-century American lawyers
20th-century American politicians
Writers from Georgia (U.S. state)
Writers from Manhattan
African-American New York City Council members